Thomas Whitfield Hornby (2 October 1831 – 1 April 1900) was an English first-class cricketer.

Hornby was born at Stockton-on-Tees. He made three appearances in first-class cricket, the first of which came for a combined Yorkshire and Durham cricket team against Nottinghamshire at Stockton-on-Tees in 1858. His next appearance came for a combined Yorkshire with Stockton-on-Tees cricket team against Cambridgeshire in 1861, while his third appearance came for England against Surrey at The Oval in 1864. He scored 65 runs in his three first-class appearances, with a high score of 22. Outside of cricket he was a hotelier, with Hornby running the Black Lion Hotel on Stockton High Street in 1892. He died at Stockton-on-Tees in April 1900.

References

External links

1831 births
1900 deaths
Cricketers from Stockton-on-Tees
English cricketers
Yorkshire and Durham cricketers
Yorkshire with Stockton-on-Tees cricketers
Non-international England cricketers
British hoteliers
19th-century British businesspeople